Pseudocrossotus albomaculatus is a species of beetle in the family Cerambycidae. It was described by Stephan von Breuning in 1938. It is known from Botswana, Angola, South Africa, Namibia, Tanzania, and Somalia.

References

Crossotini
Beetles described in 1938